Christina Dalcher is an American novelist. Her debut novel Vox was a feminist dystopian bestseller.

Life
Dalcher grew up in New Jersey. She studied at Georgetown University. From  2006 to 2009, she lived in Clerkenwell and worked at City, University of London. She lives in Norfolk, Virginia.

Her third novel "Femlandia" was published in 2021. It is set during an imagined Great Depression of 2022. It was again dystopian and it was criticised by some for dealing with gender in too binary a manner.

Works 

 Vox (2018),
 Master Class (2020) 
 Femlandia, (2021)

References 

Living people
21st-century American novelists
American women novelists
Year of birth missing (living people)